is a former Japanese rugby union player and a sports journalist. He played as a fly-half.

Matsuo was one of the greatest Japanese rugby players of all times and played for Shin-Nittetsu Kamaishi. He left competition in 1985, after seven consecutive wins.

He had 24 caps for Japan, from 1974 to 1984, scoring 3 tries, 5 conversions, 14 penalties and 3 drop goals, in an aggregate of 73 points.

After finishing his player career he became a sports journalist for the Japanese television.

External links

1954 births
Living people
People from Shibuya
People from Tokyo
Sportspeople from Tokyo
Japanese rugby union players
Rugby union fly-halves
Japan international rugby union players